Ion Ionescu may refer to:

 Ion Ionescu (footballer, born 1938), Romanian footballer
 Ion Ionescu (footballer, born 1936), Romanian footballer and coach
 Ion Ionescu de la Brad (1818–1891), Moldavian, later Romanian revolutionary, agronomist, statistician and writer